= Landestheater Oberpfalz =

Landestheater Oberpfalz is a theatre company based in Bavaria, Germany.
